Porthgwidden (meaning white cove) is a small hamlet in Cornwall, England, United Kingdom. It is located in the civil parish of Feock on the shore of the Carrick Roads.

References

Hamlets in Cornwall
Populated coastal places in Cornwall